Constanza as a place may refer to:
 Constanza, Dominican Republic
 Constanța, Romania

Constanza may also refer to:
 R v Constanza (The Crown against Gaetano Constanza), an English legal case in 1997
 José Constanza (born 1983), Dominican baseball player
 Constanza Alonso (born 1986), Argentine politician

See also
 Constance (disambiguation), especially members of the Spanish-speaking nobility, born 'Constanza'
 Constanze Mozart (1762–1842), wife of Wolfgang Amadeus Mozart
 Costanza (disambiguation)